Jennifer Whalen (born 1976) is an American professional downhill mountain bike racer who won the 2005 NORBA National Championship in the Women's Super-D class.  She lives in Idaho Springs, Colorado.

Palmares

2005
Keystone Climax  (Downhill - Pro - Senior) - 4th place 
Keystone Climax  (Super D - Expert - Senior - 19-29) - 3rd place 
Mount Snow-Shimano NMBS Finals  (Super D - Pro) - 4th place 
Snowshoe NMBS NORBA National  (SUPER D - Pro) - 2nd place 
NMBS Brian Head  (SUPER D - Pro) - 1st place 
Snowmass NORBA National  (SUPER D - Pro) - 4th place 
Schweitzer Norba Nationals  (SUPER D - Pro) - 1st place 
Wildflower Rush Race  (Downhill - Pro) - 3rd place 
Wildflower Rush Race  (Super D - Senior) - 5th place 
Deer Valley NORBA National  (SUPER D - Pro) - 5th place 
Chile Challenge AMBC  (Super D - Expert) - 4th place 
Chile Challenge AMBC  (Downhill - Pro - Senior) - 6th place 
Nova NORBA National  (SUPER-D - Pro) - 7th place

2004
Keystone Climax  (Downhill - Pro - Senior) - 4th place 
NMBS #7-Snowmass  (SUPER D - Pro) - 2nd place 
Full Tilt in Telluride  (Downhill - Pro - Senior) - 3rd place 
Blast the Mass  (Downhill - Pro - Senior) - 5th place 
Chile Challenge  (Downhill - Pro - Senior) - 10th place

2003
Final Descent  - (Downhill - Pro/Expert - Senior) - 3rd place 
Chile Challenge  (Downhill - Pro - Senior) - 3rd place 
Wells Fargo Rage in the Sage  (Downhill - Pro - Senior) - 1st place 
Tour of Canyonlands  (Downhill - Pro - Senior) - 4th place

2002
Chile Challenge  (Downhill - Expert - Senior - 19-29) - 1st place 
Tour of Canyonlands  (Downhill - Expert - Senior - 19-29) - 2nd place

2001
Telluride Mountain Bike Classic  (Downhill - Expert - Senior - 19-29) - 4th place 
NORBA NCS #3  (Downhill - Expert - Senior - 25-29) - 4th place

2000
Telluride Mountain Bike Classic  (Downhill - Expert - Senior - 19-29) - 3rd place

External links
JenX-Racer: The Official Website for Jennifer Whalen

1976 births
Living people
American female cyclists
Downhill mountain bikers
Place of birth missing (living people)
People from Idaho Springs, Colorado
American mountain bikers
21st-century American women